Kalvene Station is a railway station on the Jelgava – Liepāja Railway.

References 

Railway stations in Latvia
Railway stations opened in 1929